British High Court may refer to:
 High Court of Justice (England and Wales)
 High Court of Justiciary (Scotland)
 High Court of Justice in Northern Ireland
 High Court of Justice for the trial of Charles I
 High Court of Justice in Ireland